Maximilian Schmidbauer (born 23 December 2001) is an Austrian cyclist, who currently rides for UCI Continental team . He competed in the scratch race at the 2021 UCI Track Cycling World Championships and in the mixed team relay at the 2021 UCI Road World Championships.

Major results

Road
2018
 3rd Road race, National Junior Road Championships
2019
 2nd Overall Olympic Hopes - Belgrade Trophy Milan Panić
1st Stage 2
 3rd Time trial, National Junior Road Championships
2021
 4th Time trial, National Under-23 Road Championships

Track
2021
 National Championships
2nd Omnium
2nd Kilometer
2nd Pursuit
2nd Scratch
3rd Points race
2022
 1st  Points race, UEC European Under-23 Track Championships

References

External links
 

2001 births
Living people
Austrian male cyclists
Austrian track cyclists
Cyclists from Vienna